Nuclear fragile X mental retardation-interacting protein 2 is a protein that in humans is encoded by the NUFIP2 gene.

Interactions
NUFIP2 has been shown to interact with FMR1 and Roquin-1.

References

Further reading